Kidugua is a genus of Central African funnel weavers containing the single species, Kidugua spiralis. It was  first described by Pekka T. Lehtinen in 1967, and has only been found in Africa.

References

External links

Agelenidae
Monotypic Araneomorphae genera
Spiders of Africa
Taxa named by Pekka T. Lehtinen